Holurothrips is a genus of thrips in the family Phlaeothripidae.

Species
 Holurothrips collessi
 Holurothrips manipurensis
 Holurothrips morikawai
 Holurothrips ornatus

References

Phlaeothripidae
Thrips
Thrips genera